T-FLEX CAD (T-FLEX) – is a Russian-made parametric computer-aided design (CAD) software application for 2D design, drafting, and 3D solid modeling based on commercial Parasolid geometric kernel. It's primarily developed and distributed by Russian software company Top Systems based in Russia.
Supported platforms are limited to Microsoft Windows. Amongst features T-FLEX offers support for various CAD formats and diverse localizations.

Functionality 

T-FLEX CAD is primarily aimed at mechanical engineering. It provides drafting, modeling and assembly tools that enable engineers to develop various products, from single parts to assemblies.

T-FLEX CAD was among the first MCAD (mechanical CAD) systems to bring the power of parametric design into a native Windows environment.

T-FLEX CAD supports a unified mode of operations for all types of documents and entities: drawings, assembly drawings, solids, surfaces, parts, parts with multiple solid bodies, assembly models, sheet metal, bill of materials, etc.

T-FLEX CAD provides parametric, adaptive and associative technology aimed at family-of-parts manufacturers or other design situations that use similar geometry but require many different sizes or permutations. Entities and their parameters in T-FLEX CAD can be related to each other. Variables can be assigned for component names, visibility, material, any numeric or text attribute of any entity. They can then be processed with algebraic or logical expression to control the behavior of the design.

In addition to parametric 3D modeling T-FLEX CAD supports parametric 2D drawings creation from scratch.  Parametric 2D assemblies can be created as well by inserting parametric 2D components. The result can be fully automatic, so that a master parametric drawing does not require editing as changes are required.

T-FLEX Open API is based on .NET technology offering possibilities for developing add-on applications.

File formats 
T-FLEX native file format is

Compatibility 
T-FLEX CAD supports parasolid-compatible file formats, including:

 IGES
 STEP
 Rhino
 DWG, DXF
 SolidWorks
 Solid Edge
 Autodesk Inventor

Add-on products 

 T-FLEX Analysis - Specialized analysis tools to help engineers virtually test and analyze complicated parts and assemblies
 T-FLEX Dynamics - General-purpose motion simulation for studying the physics-based motion behavior of a CAD design
 T-FLEX Gears - Specialized tools for design, analysis and calculation of gears
 T-FLEX Electrical - Specialized tools for development of electrical systems
 T-FLEX Nesting - Automate nesting of sheet materials for various types of cutting 
 T-FLEX CAM - Manufacturing add-on for generating NC programs as well as toolpath verification and machine simulation
 T-FLEX VR – Add-on to work with a 3D model in a virtual 3D space 
 T-FLEX DOCs - PLM system, helping manage complex products, streamline operations, and increase productivity.

See also 
Comparison of CAD Software

References 

Computer-aided design software
Windows software
2011 software